Katherine Snowden Pollard is the Director of the Gladstone Institute of Data Science and Biotechnology and a professor at the University of California, San Francisco (UCSF). She is a Chan Zuckerberg Biohub Investigator. She was awarded Fellowship of the International Society for Computational Biology in 2020 and the American Institute for Medical and Biological Engineering in 2021 for outstanding contributions to computational biology and bioinformatics.

Education
Pollard received a B.A. Summa Cum Laude in Anthropology and Mathematics from Pomona College and an M.S. from the University of California, Berkeley (UC Berkeley). She was awarded a Ph.D. in 2003 from UC Berkeley for research supervised by Mark van der Laan.

Career and research
Pollard is a leader in developing statistical models and open-source software for big data, especially in genomics. Pollard and her team pioneered the identification and named the fastest-evolving regions of the human genome, known as human accelerated regions (HARs). Pollard has also designed methods to study the human microbiome and other microbial communities, these studies set the stage for using metagenomics in precision medicine.

Prior to working at UCSF, she held a postdoctoral research position with Sandrine Dudoit at UC Berkeley and worked with David Haussler at UC Santa Cruz.

Honors and awards 
 Member, National Academy of Medicine
 Fellow, American Institute for Medical and Biological Engineering. 2021. 
Fellow, International Society for Computational Biology. 2020. 
 Gladstone Institutes Mentoring Award. 2019.
 Women Who Lead in the Life Sciences. SF Business Times. 2018. 
 75 Most Influential Alumni, UC Berkeley School of Public Health. 2018.
 Chan Zuckerberg Biohub Investigator. 2017–present. 
 Fellow, California Academy of Sciences. 2013–present. 
 Breakthrough Biomedical Research Award, UCSF. 2009–2010.
 Sloan Research Fellowship, Alfred P. Sloan Foundation. 2008–2010. 
 NIH Postdoctoral Fellowship, NIGMS/NIH NRSA. 2003–2005.
 Evelyn Fix Prize, Chin Long Chiang Biostatistics Student of the Year, UC Berkeley. 2003.
 Valedictorian, High Scholarship Prize, Math Prize, Anthropology Prize, Phi Beta Kappa Award, Pomona College. 1995.
 Sophomore Math Prize, Pomona College. 1993.

References

External links 

 Homepage
 Gladstone Institutes Homepage
 Publications
 Human Accelerated Regions

Living people
American bioinformaticians
Fellows of the International Society for Computational Biology
Pomona College alumni
Year of birth missing (living people)
Members of the National Academy of Medicine
University of California, Berkeley alumni
Biostatisticians